Wudan is a town in Ongniud Banner, Inner Mongolia, China. , it had 27 villages under its administration, including 16 gaqaa.

References 

Township-level divisions of Inner Mongolia
Ongniud Banner